Grace Notes is a novel by Bernard MacLaverty,  first published in 1997. It was was shortlisted for the prestigious Booker Prize for Fiction.

Plot summary
The book centers around the postpartum depression of its female protagonist, Catherine McKenna, a Northern Irish music teacher and composer living in Scotland. She faces preparations for her father's funeral, endures disturbing visions regarding her recently born daughter, Anna, and suffers restrictions imposed by the Catholic Church on her family and her childhood. She engages her depression through the cathartic and intuitive composition of music; later in the book, she begins to craft a master symphony. The novel ends with a powerful live radio broadcast of her symphony.

The title is an explicit reference to grace notes, which a character in the novel terms as "the notes between the notes". The redeeming power of art is indeed a prominent theme. In addition, critics have considered the concept of fleeting and minute musical notes as descriptive of the novel's style (Donath).

References
The Richmond Review
Harte, Liam. Literary Encyclopedia
Donath, Reinhard. Bernard MacLaverty - Grace Notes (1997)
The Man Booker Prize 2007

1997 British novels
Novels by Bernard MacLaverty
Novels set in Scotland
Novels about music
Jonathan Cape books